The 1849 Connecticut gubernatorial election was held on April 2, 1849. Former congressman and Whig nominee Joseph Trumbull defeated former congressman and Democratic nominee Thomas H. Seymour as well as former Senator and Free Soil nominee John M. Niles with 49.35% of the vote. Niles had previously been the Democratic nominee for this same office in 1840.

Trumbull won a plurality of the vote, but fell short of a majority. As a result, the Connecticut General Assembly elected the governor, per the state constitution. Trumbull won the vote over Seymour 122 to 110 in the General Assembly, and became the governor. This was the first of six consecutive elections in which the Free Soil Party participated.

General election

Candidates
Major party candidates

Joseph Trumbull, Whig
Thomas H. Seymour, Democratic

Minor party candidates

John M. Niles, Free Soil

Results

References

1849
Connecticut
Gubernatorial